Zlatanov is a Bulgarian surname, with female form Zlatanova. Notable people with the surname include:

Dimitar Zlatanov (born 1948), Bulgarian volleyball player
Hristo Zlatanov (born 1976, Bulgarian volleyball player
Jaklin Zlatanova (born 1988), Bulgarian basketball player
Nikola Zlatanov (born 1961), Bulgarian rower
Radoslav Zlatanov (born 1987), visually impaired Bulgarian track and field athlete
Sisi Zlatanova, Bulgarian researcher in geospatial data
Smilen Zlatanov (born 1992), Bulgarian footballer
Zinaida Zlatanova, Bulgarian Minister of Justice in the Oresharski Government

Bulgarian-language surnames